Nyaungbintha may refer to the following places in Burma:

Nyaungbintha, Hsi Hseng
Nyaungbintha, Homalin
Nyaungbintha, Amarapura
Nyaungbintha, Mogok
Nyaungbintha, Ingapu
Nyaungbintha, Sagaing